Events in the year 2008 in Bulgaria.

Incumbents 

 President: Georgi Parvanov
 Prime Minister: Sergei Stanishev

Events 

 September – The European Commission permanently strips Bulgaria of half of the aid frozen in July over what it says is the government's failure to tackle corruption and organised crime.

Deaths 

 13 September – Konstantin Pavlov, screenwriter, author and poet (b. 1933).

References 

 
2000s in Bulgaria
Years of the 21st century in Bulgaria
Bulgaria
Bulgaria